"When a Man Loves a Woman" is a song written by Calvin Lewis and Andrew Wright and first recorded by Percy Sledge in 1966 at Norala Sound Studio in Sheffield, Alabama. It made number one on both the Billboard Hot 100 and R&B singles charts. Country singer John Wesley Ryles had a minor hit with his version of the song in 1976 while singer and actress Bette Midler recorded the song 14 years later and had a Top 40 hit with her version in 1980. In 1991, Michael Bolton recorded the song and his version peaked at number one on both the Billboard Hot 100 chart and the Billboard Adult Contemporary Singles chart.

Percy Sledge original version

Background
According to Dan Penn the song was initially recorded by Percy Sledge at Rick Hall's FAME Studios at Muscle Shoals, before being re-recorded at the nearby Norala Studios owned by Quin Ivy. According to Quin Ivy, Percy Sledge was introduced to him by his friend Leroy Wright in Ivy's Tune Town record store. Wright convinced him to audition Sledge and his band the Esquires.  The sidemen for the recording included Spooner Oldham, Farfisa organ; Marlin Greene, guitar; Albert "Junior" Lowe, electric bass and Roger Hawkins, drums.  Also on the session were Jack Peck, trumpet, Billy Cofield and Don “Rim” Pollard, tenor sax, and Jerry Eddleman, Jeannie Greene, Sandy Posey and Hershel Wiggington, backing vocals.  Andrew Wright and Calvin Lewis did not play on the record. Rick Hall arranged a distribution deal with Atlantic Records, but Jerry Wexler asked that the song be re-recorded because the horns were out of tune. According to musician David Hood, "They went back in the studio and changed the horns, got different horn players to play on it. But then the tapes got mixed up and Atlantic put out their original version. So that's the hit."

Reception
Released by Atlantic Records in April 1966, Sledge's recording reached number one on both the Billboard Hot 100 and R&B singles charts,  becoming the first number 1 hit recorded in Muscle Shoals. It is also one of seven number 1 hits to debut on the Billboard Hot 100 at number 100.  The single was also a top ten hit in the UK reaching number four on its initial release and ultimately peaking at number two in 1987 on the UK Singles Chart after it was featured in a Levi's Jeans commercial. The Percy Sledge version is listed 53rd in Rolling Stone'''s 500 Greatest Songs of All Time. Also in 1987, it was reissued in the US to promote the soundtrack album for Oliver Stone's film Platoon.

Authorship
Calvin Lewis and Andrew Wright were members of the Esquires, a band in Sheffield, Alabama fronted by singer Percy Sledge.  According to Wright, "We were set to play a Friday night dance, and we were practicing ... I was messing around on the organ when this riff came up out of nowhere. There was no one in the club but us. I told Calvin to go home and write some words."   The next night, they rehearsed the emerging song with Sledge, changed it around, and soon afterwards auditioned the song for local businessman and radio DJ Quin Ivy.  He liked the song but suggested that some of the words be changed to give a more positive message. Wright said, "We kept some of the phrases, worked on it for several weeks, and spent quite a bit of time in the studio."

Although the writing of the song is credited to Lewis and Wright, Sledge later said that he should have received a co-writing credit.  In one story, Sledge said that one night he was upset over a broken relationship and asked Lewis and Wright to play a slow blues over which he improvised lyrics describing his emotions; Quin Ivy was at the show and asked the band to refine the lyrics so that it could be recorded.  Sledge said that he allowed Lewis and Wright to take the writing credits because they gave him the opportunity "to sing his heart out".

In another interview, Sledge said:When I wrote the song at first, it was called "Why Did You Leave Me Baby". And I changed it from that to "When a Man Loves a Woman". I just reversed it.  Quin told me that if I was to write some lyrics around that melody and the expression I'd put into "Why Did You Leave Me Baby", he believed it would've been a hit record.  He was one of the top disc jockeys at that time. Sure enough, he asked me if I had any lyrics for that. He said, "That's it! Write a story around that title! What a song that would be with that feeling you had!" It was a song that was meant to be. It wasn't just what I had done; it was the musicians, the producer, the background singers, the right time.

Charts

Michael Bolton version

Background
"When a Man Loves a Woman" was covered by singer Michael Bolton for his seventh studio album, Time, Love & Tenderness (1991). His version of the song reached number one on the US Billboard Hot 100 and Adult Contemporary charts, becoming Bolton's second US number-one hit. Bolton also received a Grammy Award for this song. This version has the distinction of being the last number one song to chart on the old Billboard Hot 100 charting system that relied on sales and airplay reports before switching over to Nielsen SoundScan. With the Percy Sledge original having reached number one previously, Bolton's version made it the seventh song to top the Hot 100 as recorded by multiple artists.

Charts

Weekly charts

Year-end charts

Release history

Other cover versions
American Country singer John Wesley Ryles covered the song for his 1977 self-titled studio album, which also included a cover of "Tell It Like It Is". Ryles's version was a minor hit, reaching Number 72 on the Billboard Hot Country Songs chart.

In 1968, Croatian singer Josipa Lisac covered the song.

In 1979, American actress and singer Bette Midler covered the song for the soundtrack of The Rose, which tells a fictionalized version of Janis Joplin's life story. Midler's version was released as a single the following year and peaked at Number 35 on the Billboard Hot 100.

Australian rock singer Jimmy Barnes released a version of "When a Man Loves a Woman" as the lead single from his 1988 live album Barnestorming. Barnes' version peaked at number 3 on the ARIA Charts and number 11 on the Official New Zealand Music Chart's top singles list.

English singer Joe Cocker covered the song for the 1989 live album Soul Session Live'', by "James Brown & Friends". Though not released as a single, Cocker's rendition was nominated for the Grammy Award for Best R&B Song in 1990.

See also
List of number-one adult contemporary singles of 1991 (U.S.)

References

External links
Percy Sledge article on The Standard Report
"When a Man Loves a Woman" in Rolling Stone's 500 Greatest Songs

1966 singles
1991 singles
Billboard Hot 100 number-one singles
Cashbox number-one singles
Michael Bolton songs
Percy Sledge songs
John Wesley Ryles songs
Jack Grayson songs
Jimmy Barnes songs
Bette Midler songs
Pacific Gas & Electric (band) songs
Rhythm and blues ballads
Pop ballads
Narvel Felts songs
RPM Top Singles number-one singles
Atlantic Records singles
Columbia Records singles
1966 songs
1960s ballads